"Nobody Knows Me" is a B-side by Madonna

Nobody Knows Me may also refer to:

Music
Nobody Knows Me, an album by Utah Philips 1961
Nobody Knows Me, an album by Martin Gerschwitz 2000
"Nobody Knows Me", a B-side to the 1990 Lyle Lovett song "Here I Am"
"Nobody Knows Me" (Mick Greenwood song), 1972
"Nobody Knows Me", a song by Danelectro player Richard Barone from Clouds Over Eden album